Kym Lardner (born 1957 in Adelaide, South Australia), is an Australian children's author, illustrator, and storyteller.

Writing 

His first picture book The Sad Little Monster and the Jelly Bean Queen was published by Hodder and Stoughton in 1981. After many years of live storytelling in Australian schools his show was recorded by the ABC (Australian Broadcasting Corporation). Kym continues to perform in schools, at children's festivals and has visited London twice for storytelling in schools there. Kym Lardner continues to write picture books now illustrated by his son, Oliver. Kym is preparing a sequel to his first book to be entitled "Sad Little Monster comes back" as well as two other volumes being the back stories of the two characters.

Bibliography

Picture books 
The Sad Little Monster and the Jelly Bean Queen (1981) 
Grandpa's Horses (1986)
Arnold the Prickly Teddy (1989) 
Jezza (1991) written by Krista Bell - illustrated by Kym
The Coat-hanger Horse (1992)
The Naked Penguin (2008) illustrated by Oliver Lardner (son)
The Dragon's Lie (2009) illustrated by Oliver Lardner (son)

Audio recordings

McMuscles and other stories for giggling (1996)
Sunglasses and more stories for giggling (1996)
Bandaid and other stories for giggling (1998)
Father and son stories a compilation from his previous CDs (2004)

References 

 http://trove.nla.gov.au/work/34782070?selectedversion=NBD42142438
 http://trove.nla.gov.au/work/32081539?selectedversion=NBD41571169
 http://www.abc.net.au/local/audio/2010/07/01/2941794.htm
 http://somerville-rise-ps.vic.edu.au/wp-content/uploads/sites/105/2015/09/Kym-Lardner-Visit-note.pdf
 http://shg.tas.edu.au/2011/04/13/kym-lardner-entertains-the-students/
 http://www.claytonsouthps.vic.edu.au/app/webroot/uploaded_files/media/kym_lardner_incursion..pdf
 http://aussiereviews.com/2004/05/childrens-audiobook-review-bandaid-by-kym-lardner/
 http://www.thelittlebigbookclub.com.au/creator/kym-lardner
 http://www.standrews-p.schools.nsw.edu.au/news/kym-lardner-author-visit?pparam&old
 http://www.watsoniaheightsps.vic.edu.au/page/96/Grade-1/2

Living people
Australian children's writers
1957 births
Writers from Adelaide